is a concert hall in Ochanomizu, Tokyo, Japan. It is named in honour of cellist Pau Casals. The hall opened in 1987 as a venue for chamber music and has a shoebox-style auditorium which seats 511. Arata Isozaki was the architect, with acoustic design by Nagata Acoustics. In 1997, for the tenth anniversary celebrations, a 41 stop organ by Jürgen Ahrend was installed.

The hall had originally been owned and sponsored by publishers  but economic conditions resulted in the withdrawal of funding in 2000. In 2003 Nihon University acquired the Ochanomizu Square Building, of which the hall forms part, from the company. On 31 March 2010 the university closed the hall. A campaign has been launched to reopen the hall by the Save Casals Hall Committee, with pianist  the chair and Marta Casals Istomin, Pablo Casals' widow, an honorary adviser.

See also
 Pau Casals

References

External links
 Homepage

Music venues in Tokyo
Concert halls in Japan
Nihon University
Music venues completed in 1987
1987 establishments in Japan
Buildings and structures completed in 1987
Arata Isozaki buildings